Polyelasmoceratidae is a family of oncocerid nautiloids characterized by rapidly expanding endogastrically curved shells, curved such that the ventral side is longitudinally concave. In cross section shells are typically tear-drop in shape to subtriangular. The siphuncle is typically nummuloidal, like a string of beads, with outwardly flared septal necks, and located between the center and the venter. Most contain radially lamellar actinosiphonate deposits.

The Middle Silurian Danaoceras is probably the ancestral genus, which give rise to the contemporary Codoceras and ultimately the subsequent Devonian genera.

References

 Walter C. Sweet, 1964. Nautiloidea - Oncocerida; Treatise on Invertebrate Paleontology, Part K. Geological Society of America and University of Kansas Press.

Oncocerida
Silurian first appearances
Middle Devonian extinctions
Nautiloid families